Joseph Spencer Cornwall (February 23, 1888 – February 26, 1983) was a conductor of the Mormon Tabernacle Choir in the mid-20th century.

Cornwall was born at Mill Creek, Utah Territory.

Cornwall was the conductor of the Mormon Tabernacle Choir from 1935 to 1957. Under his leadership the choir made some of its first trips outside of the United States. Probably the most noted of these was when it performed at the dedication of the Swiss Temple.

Cornwall was also a writer. He wrote The Story of Our Mormon Hymns as well as a centennial history of the Mormon Tabernacle Choir, A Century of Singing, published by Deseret Book in 1958.

Among his early music instructors was George Careless.

As choir director, Cornwall tried to raise the level of performance in the choir.

Cornwall composed the music to John Jaques's "Softly Beams the Sacred Dawning," which is hymn #56 in the 1985 LDS Church hymnal.

Personal life
Cornwall married Mary Alice Haigh. Cornwall first met her when her music instructor, Hugh W. Dougall, asked Cornwall to accompany a song by Haigh. Haigh performed widely after her marriage to Cornwall and was later a member of the Mormon Tabernacle Choir before and during her husband's time as director of the choir. The Cornwalls had seven children, the youngest of whom is Carol Cornwall Madsen.

Notes

1888 births
1983 deaths
20th-century American conductors (music)
American Latter Day Saint hymnwriters
American Latter Day Saints
American choral conductors
American male conductors (music)
Musicians from Salt Lake City
Tabernacle Choir music directors
20th-century male musicians